Harry Walker Wellford (August 6, 1924 – April 17, 2021) was a senior United States circuit judge of the United States Court of Appeals for the Sixth Circuit and a United States district judge of the United States District Court for the Western District of Tennessee.

Education and early career
Wellford was born on August 6, 1924, in Memphis, Tennessee. He received a Bachelor of Arts degree from Washington and Lee University in 1947. He received a Bachelor of Laws from Vanderbilt University Law School in 1950. He was in the United States Navy as an Ensign from 1944 to 1946. He was in private practice of law in Memphis from 1950 to 1970. He also was active in political affairs, managing the successful campaigns of Howard Baker for United States Senate in 1966 and Winfield Dunn for Governor of Tennessee in 1970.

Federal judicial service
Wellford was nominated by President Richard Nixon on November 24, 1970, to the United States District Court for the Western District of Tennessee, to a new seat created by 84 Stat. 294. He was confirmed by the United States Senate on December 11, 1970, and received commission on December 12, 1970. His service was terminated on September 10, 1982, due to elevation to the Sixth Circuit.

On August 4, 1976 President Gerald Ford nominated Wellford to a seat on the United States Court of Appeals for the Sixth Circuit to replace William Ernest Miller, who had died on April 12, 1976. Civil rights groups objected to Wellford's nomination and, with the nomination coming so late in Ford's presidency, the Senate never took a vote on his nomination before Ford left office. President Jimmy Carter declined to renominate Wellford when he took office, nominating Gilbert S. Merritt Jr. instead.

On July 27, 1982, he was nominated by President Ronald Reagan, to a seat on the United States Court of Appeals for the Sixth Circuit vacated by Judge Bailey Brown. He was confirmed by the Senate on August 20, 1982, and received commission the same day. He assumed senior status on January 15, 1991.

Personal life
Wellford was married to Katherine Estes Potts Wellford, and they had five children. He died in Memphis in April 2021 at the age of 96. On September 2, 2022, his granddaughter Eliza Fletcher, a kindergarten teacher, was kidnapped, raped and murdered while out for an early morning jog in Memphis in a case that attracted national media attention.

See also 
 Gerald Ford judicial appointment controversies
 List of United States federal judges by longevity of service

References

Sources
 

1924 births
2021 deaths
20th-century American judges
21st-century American judges
Judges of the United States Court of Appeals for the Sixth Circuit
Judges of the United States District Court for the Western District of Tennessee
Military personnel from Tennessee
Politicians from Memphis, Tennessee
Tennessee Republicans
United States court of appeals judges appointed by Ronald Reagan
United States district court judges appointed by Richard Nixon
United States Navy officers
Vanderbilt University alumni
Washington and Lee University alumni
United States Navy personnel of World War II